Schnieder is a German occupational surname for a tailor. Notable people with this name include:
Patrick Schnieder (born 1968), German lawyer and politician of the Christian Democratic Union (CDU)
Rob Schnieder (born 1963), American actor, comedian, and screenwriter

References

German-language surnames
Occupational surnames